Schönebeck or Schoenebeck may refer to:

 Schönebeck, a town in Saxony-Anhalt, Germany
 Schönebeck (district), a Landkreis in Saxony-Anhalt
 Schönebeck (Elbe), a former Verwaltungsgemeinschaft (collective municipality) in Saxony-Anhalt
 People from Schönebeck, Saxony-Anhalt
 Schönebeck, a small river in North Rhine-Westphalia, Germany, tributary of the Wupper
 Essen-Schönebeck, a suburb of Essen, North Rhine-Westfalia, Germany
 SG Essen-Schönebeck, a soccer club in Essen
 Bremen-Schönebeck, a suburb of Bremen, Germany
 Bremen-Schönebeck station, a railway station in Bremen
 Sarita Schoenebeck, an American computer scientist